Oxynoe panamensis is a species of small sea snail or sea slug, a bubble snail, a marine gastropod mollusk in the family Oxynoidae.

Distribution
Oxynoe panamensis is found in mangrove swamps along the Baja California peninsula and Mexico coasts.
The type locality for this species is Bocas Islands, Panama.

Life habits
This species feeds on Caulerpa sertularioides, a green siphonaceous algae. When irritated, Oxynoe panamensis excretes a potent, milky toxin from its skin. There is known autotomy of the tail under persistent mechanical irritation.

References

External links 
Images of Oxynoe panamensis
 http://www.seaslugforum.net/factsheet/oxynpana

Oxynoidae
Gastropods described in 1943